KaVo Kerr is a dental equipment manufacturer group that was spun off from Danaher Corporation. The group stemmed from a joint venture set up in 2016 between KaVo (KaVo Dental GmbH), which was established in 1909 in Berlin, Germany, and Kerr Corporation, which was founded in 1891 in Detroit, Michigan, as well as a division of Danaher Corporation headquartered in Brea, California.

History

Kerr 
Kerr was established in 1891 in Detroit, Michigan by brothers Robert and John Kerr as The Detroit Dental Manufacturing Company and started to offer its products and services to the European market in 1893. The company officially changed its name to The KERR Manufacturing Company in 1939.

The company established its first factory in Europe in Scafati, Italy in 1959. Kerr acquired part of the McShirley line of products in 1971. Later in 1978, the Sybron Dental Product Division was formed.

In 2001, Kerr acquired Hawe Neos company in the aim of enhancing its offer of prophylaxis consumables. In 2006, Kerr became part of Danaher Corporation. In 2014, Kerr acquired DUX Dental and Vettec Inc. In 2015, Total Care, Axis SybronEndo and Kerr reorganized into a unilateral organization: Kerr Dental.

KaVo 
KaVo was established in 1909 in Berlin, Germany by Alois Kaltenbach as KaVo Dental GmbH. By 1919, Richard Voigt joined the Kavo and the number of the employees expanded to 300 by 1939. In 1946, the headquarters were moved from Potsdam to the Upper Swabian town of Biberach an der Riss. In 1959, the company opened a dental technology factory in Leutkirch. In 2004, it was purchased by the US-American Danaher Corporation. In the same year, KaVo acquired Gendex. In 2005, KaVo acquired Pelton & Crane, a dental operatory equipment manufacturer with a 100-year history in North America, and joined the KaVo Kerr family along with DEXIS. In 2007, i-CAT was acquired by Kavo, formerly Soredex imaging brands in 2009. In 2012, Aribex, which is best known for the NOMAD handheld and portable X-ray systems, was acquired by KaVo Dental Group.

Recently, Danaher Corporation spun off its dental segments into an independent publicly-traded company - Envista Holdings Corporation. Envista will employ 12,000 people worldwide.

See also 
 PaloDEx
 :de:KaVo Dental (German)

References

External links 
 Official website

Danaher Corporation
Dental companies of the United States
Companies based in Brea, California